István Eszlátyi (born 24 February 1991 in Bonyhád) is a Hungarian football player who currently plays for Komárom.

References

External links
HLSZ

1991 births
Living people
People from Bonyhád
Hungarian footballers
Association football forwards
Barcsi SC footballers
Pécsi MFC players
Kozármisleny SE footballers
BKV Előre SC footballers
Lombard-Pápa TFC footballers
Soproni VSE players
Kisvárda FC players
Békéscsaba 1912 Előre footballers
Mosonmagyaróvári TE 1904 footballers
Szombathelyi Haladás footballers
Nemzeti Bajnokság I players
Nemzeti Bajnokság II players
Sportspeople from Tolna County